The Chinese Mayor, original title Datong (大同), is a 2015 documentary that follows Datong mayor Geng Yanbo's efforts to transform one of the China's most polluted cities into a cultural destination, in large part by displacing 500,000 residents (about 200,000 homes demolished) to reconstruct the 14th century Ming Dynasty walls of the Old City.

Premiere
The film's American premiere occurred at the Sundance Festival, where it was awarded a "Special Jury Award for Unparalleled Access"

Accolades

Reviews
The film received favorable reviews, but as of the summer of 2015 the film was still seeking an American distribution partner. In the US, the film can be rented on YouTube. On 10 February 2019, BBC World News televised the documentary.

References

Chinese documentary films